Rose Kennedy: A Life To Remember is a short documentary directed by Terry Sanders and produced by Sanders with Freida Lee Mock. It was nominated for a Best Documentary Short Oscar in 1991.

References

External links
Rose Kennedy: A Life to Remember at American Film Foundation

1990 films
American short documentary films
Documentary films about the Kennedy family
Films directed by Freida Lee Mock
Films directed by Terry Sanders
American black-and-white films
1990s short documentary films
1990 documentary films
1990s English-language films
1990s American films